Denise Parker (born December 12, 1973) is an American archer who was a member of the American squad that won the team bronze medals at the 1988 Summer Olympics. She also competed in the individual event, finishing in 21st place. She also competed in both the individual and team events in the 1992 Summer Olympics and the 2000 Summer Olympics. Parker was born in Salt Lake City, Utah.

References

1973 births
Living people
American female archers
Archers at the 1988 Summer Olympics
Archers at the 1992 Summer Olympics
Archers at the 2000 Summer Olympics
Olympic bronze medalists for the United States in archery
Medalists at the 1988 Summer Olympics
Pan American Games gold medalists for the United States
Pan American Games medalists in archery
Archers at the 1987 Pan American Games
Archers at the 1991 Pan American Games
Archers at the 1999 Pan American Games
Archers at the 1995 Pan American Games
Medalists at the 1987 Pan American Games
Medalists at the 1991 Pan American Games
Medalists at the 1995 Pan American Games
Medalists at the 1999 Pan American Games
21st-century American women